Antelope are herbivorous mammals.

Antelope may also refer to:

Animals
 Pronghorn, often referred to as the pronghorn antelope, and the only surviving member of the family Antilocapridae

Places

United States
 Antelope, California, in Sacramento County
 Dunnigan, California, formerly named Antelope
 Antelope, Kansas
 Antelope, Montana
 Antelope, Oregon
 Antelope, South Dakota
 Antelope, Texas
 Antelope Canyon, canyon in Arizona

Elsewhere
 Antelope, Newfoundland and Labrador, Canada
 Antelope Mine, Zimbabwe

Transportation

Aircraft
 Avro Antelope, British light bomber of the 1920s
 Sopwith Antelope, small post-World War I British transport airplane

Rail transportation
 Antelope (passenger train), a regular revenue train of the Atchison, Topeka and Santa Fe Railway
 Antelope (Eagle class), a 4-4-0 saddle tank broad gauge locomotive
 LNER Thompson Class B1 locomotives, known as 'Bongos' or 'Antelopes'

Ships
 HMS Antelope, twelve ships of the Royal Navy
 USS Antelope, three ships of the US Navy
 Antelope (ship), one of numerous non-military vessels named Antelope

Other uses
 Grand Canyon Antelopes, athletic teams of Grand Canyon University
 The Antelope, a case before the United States Supreme Court, arising from the capture of the slave ship Antelope
 Antelope Ground, a former cricket and football stadium in Southampton, England
 antelope.tigris.org, a graphical user interface for running Apache Ant
 Antelope Powder, a brand name for the food additive disodium pyrophosphate

See also
 
 
 List of mountain ranges named Antelope
Antilope, a taxonomic genus containing the blackbuck